The South Auckland volcanic field, also known as the Franklin Volcanic Field, is an area of extinct monogenetic volcanoes around Pukekohe, the Franklin area and north-western Waikato, south of the Auckland volcanic field. The field contains at least 82 volcanoes, which erupted between 550,000 and 1,600,000 years ago.

Features

The field extends from Pukekiwiriki east of Papakura in the north and Pukekawa in the south. The field contains at least 82 volcanoes, and is older than the Auckland volcanic field to the north. The youngest volcanoes are likely the Bombay Hills shield volcano, which erupted an estimated 600,000 years ago, and Pukekohe Hill, the largest shield volcano of the field, which erupted an estimated 550,000 years ago. The field can be divided into three broad geographic areas: the north-eastern section, which consists of eroded remnants of lava flows and scoria cones, some of which are found in the south-western Hunua Ranges, the southern section to the south of the Waikato River, which features many of the more recent and better preserved scoria cones, and the central section, which forms much of the low-lying land of the Pukekohe area, between the Manukau Harbour and Waikato River.

Context

Relations to other volcanic activity
Other basaltic volcanic fields that are also now thought to represent intraplate volcanism active in the Pleistocene are adjacent from the south in a more recent to the north trend. As already mentioned the younger Auckland volcanic field is to its immediate north. To the south west is the older Ngatutura volcanic field which was active between 1,830,000 and 1,540,000 years ago and these locations fit with the south north trend being related to the opening of the Hauraki Rift in the Miocene or fracturing of the lithosphere. Further south is the Alexandra Volcanic Group. To its west, are the even older volcanoes associated with the Northland-Mohakatino volcanic belt (Mohakatino Volcanic Arc) which are of a subduction-related origin but which include the still active Mount Taranaki at the southern end of this belt.  To the south and east, visible on the horizon from the Bombay Hills are back arc volcanoes. These include the volcanoes of the Taupō Volcanic Zone to the south which have now been continuously active for over 2 million years.  This was also the time that activity ceased in the extinct volcanoes of the Coromandel Peninsula in the Coromandel Volcanic Zone to the east.

Tectonics

Many of the volcanoes are related to known fault structures. The volcanoes are located south of the Auckland volcanic field which is also part of what has been termed the Auckland Volcanic Province. The structure of the Auckland regional faults and the resulting fault blocks is complex but like the volcanic field their locations can be postulated to be related to gravitational variations and where the Stokes Magnetic Anomaly passes through this section of the North Island.

A north south line of central volcanoes is orientated along the Drury Fault.  These extend from Papakura through and beyound the Bombay Hills. While the western margin of the belt is defined by the north-south Wairoa North Fault the eastern margins have at least three east-west fault lines. The unnamed most northern of these was presumably followed by the basaltic extrusion that extended all the way to the Morley Road tuff rings. The volcanoes along the lines of the Waiuku Fault and to the south the Waikato Fault that is also followed by the mouth of the Waikato River suggest that there has been strong volcano-tectonic relationships during the fields historic eruption activity.

Identification

The volcanic nature of the Tuakau and Pukekohe areas was first identified by Ferdinand von Hochstetter in 1859, however the first volcanic cones only began to be identified in the mid-20th century.

List of volcanoes

References

Monogenetic volcanic fields
Geography of Auckland
Landforms of the Auckland Region

Volcanism of New Zealand
Geology of New Zealand
Volcanoes of Waikato
Volcanoes of the Auckland Region
Auckland Volcanic Province